The Fort Worth Classic was a postseason college football bowl game played only once, on January 1, 1921, at Panther Park in Fort Worth, Texas, between Centre Praying Colonels of Centre College and the TCU Horned Frogs of Texas Christian University.

Centre entered the game with a record of 7–2 with wins against Kentucky and VPI. Centre's losses came against Harvard (8–0–1 on the year) and Georgia Tech (8–1 on the year). Centre had outscored its opponents 469–55 and won its first three games of the year by a combined score of 241–0.

TCU entered the game with a record of 9–0, including wins at Arkansas (19–2) and at Baylor (21–9). TCU had attained its perfect record while outscoring its opponents 163–46.

Centre won the game handily by a score of 63 to 7.

This game should not be confused with the modern Fort Worth Bowl, now called the Lockheed Martin Armed Forces Bowl.

See also
 List of college bowl games

References

1920–21 NCAA football bowl games
Defunct college football bowls
Centre Colonels football bowl games
TCU Horned Frogs football bowl games
January 1921 sports events
1921 in sports in Texas
Sports competitions in Fort Worth, Texas
January 1921 events in the United States